Troy Alan Carter (born July 31, 1973) is an American plasma physicist and a professor at the University of California, Los Angeles. He was co-awarded the 2002 John Dawson Award for Excellence in Plasma Physics Research for his work on driven magnetic reconnection in a laboratory plasma.

Early life and career 
Carter received a Bachelor of Science (B.S.) in physics and a B.S. in nuclear engineering from North Carolina State University in 1995. He then received a Master of Arts and a Doctor of Philosophy in Astrophysical Sciences from Princeton University in 1997 and 2001 respectively, where he was supervised by Masaaki Yamada and Russell Kulsrud. Upon graduation, Carter was awarded a Fusion Energy Postdoctoral Fellowship from the US Department of Energy and pursued his postdoctoral work at UCLA.

In 2002, Carter became a faculty member at UCLA's Department of Physics and Astronomy. He was assistant professor until 2008 where he was promoted to associate professor, and was later promoted to full professor in 2011. In 2016, he became the director of the Basic Plasma Science Facility and oversaw the renewal of the facility funding from the National Science Foundation. In 2017, he became a director of the Plasma Science and Technology Institute at UCLA.

Honors and awards 
In 2002, Carter was jointly awarded the John Dawson Award for Excellence in Plasma Physics Research with Hantao Ji, Masaaki Yamada and Scott Hsu for "the experimental investigation of driven magnetic reconnection in a laboratory plasma. In this work, careful diagnostic studies of the current sheet structure, dynamics and associated wave activity provide a comprehensive picture of the reconnection process."

In 2014, Carter was inducted as a fellow of the American Physical Society.

References 

Living people
21st-century American physicists
American plasma physicists
Fellows of the American Physical Society
North Carolina State University alumni
Princeton University alumni
1973 births